The DJK Vilzing is a German association football club from the village of Vilzing, located near Cham, Bavaria. DJK stands for Deutsche Jugendkraft, a sports organisation associated with the Catholic Church.

The club's greatest success came in 2014 when it qualified for the southern division of the Bayernliga, the fifth tier of the German football league system.

History
For much of the first 30 years of its history the club had been a non-descript amateur side in local Bavarian football until a championship in the Bezirksliga Oberpfalz-Süd in 1998, a league which the club had played in since 1995, earned it promotion to the Bezirksoberliga.

Playing in the Bezirksoberliga Oberpfalz for two seasons from 1998 to 2000 DJK came fourth in its first season there, followed by a league championship and promotion the year after. A six-year stint in the Landesliga Bayern-Mitte followed in which the club, after three difficult first seasons finished in the top four in 2004 and 2005. However, in the 2005–06 season Vilzing came sixteenth and was relegated back to the Bezirksoberliga.

Another league championship the following year saw the club move back up to the Landesliga and come third in its first season back. Vilzings results gradually worsened season after season, resulting in another relegation from the league in 2011. The club played the 2011–12 season in the Bezirksoberliga once more, which was also going to be the last for this league. The Bezirksoberligas were disbanded in 2012 and the Landesligas expanded from three to five divisions, allowing the club to move up to the Landesliga once more despite finishing only fourth.

DJK entered the Landesliga Bayern-Mitte once more but this league now covered a much smaller area then the previous league which had existed from 1963 to 2012. In its inaugural season the club came second but failed to achieve Bayernliga qualification in the promotion round. The second season saw Vilzing repeat this result but this time it succeeded in the promotion round and qualified for the southern division of the Bayernliga for 2014–15. The club finished in fifth place in its first-ever Bayernliga season.

Honours
The club's honours:

League
 Bayernliga Nord
 Champions: 2022
 Runners-up: 2020, 2021
 Landesliga Bayern-Mitte
 Runners-up: 2013, 2014
 Bezirksoberliga Oberpfalz
 Champions: 2000, 2007
 Bezirksliga Oberpfalz-Süd
 Champions: 1998

Cup
 Oberpfalz Cup
 Runners-up: 2007

Recent seasons
The recent season-by-season performance of the club:

With the introduction of the Bezirksoberligas in 1988 as the new fifth tier, below the Landesligas, all leagues below dropped one tier. With the introduction of the Regionalligas in 1994 and the 3. Liga in 2008 as the new third tier, below the 2. Bundesliga, all leagues below dropped one tier. With the establishment of the Regionalliga Bayern as the new fourth tier in Bavaria in 2012 the Bayernliga was split into a northern and a southern division, the number of Landesligas expanded from three to five and the Bezirksoberligas abolished. All leagues from the Bezirksligas onwards were elevated one tier.

Key

References

External links
 Official team site  
 Das deutsche Fußball-Archiv  historical German domestic league tables
 Manfreds Fussball Archiv   Tables and results from the Bavarian amateur leagues
 DJK Vilzing at Weltfussball.de 

Football clubs in Germany
Football clubs in Bavaria
Football in Upper Palatinate
Association football clubs established in 1967
1967 establishments in West Germany
German Youth Power Sports Association
Cham (district)